The 1954 National Football League Draft was held on January 28, 1954, at The Bellevue-Stratford Hotel in Philadelphia.

This was the eighth year that the first overall pick was a bonus pick determined by lottery. With the previous seven winners ineligible from the draw, only the Baltimore Colts, Chicago Cardinals, Cleveland Browns, Green Bay Packers, and Pittsburgh Steelers had an equal chance of winning. The draft lottery was won by Cleveland, who selected quarterback Bobby Garrett.

Player selections

Round one

Round two

Round three

Round four

Round five

Round six

Round seven

Round eight

Round nine

Round ten

Round eleven

Round twelve

Round thirteen

Round fourteen

Round fifteen

Round sixteen

Round seventeen

Round eighteen

Round nineteen

Round twenty

Round twenty-one

Round twenty-two

Round twenty-three

Round twenty-four

Round twenty-five

Round twenty-six

Round twenty-seven

Round twenty-eight

Round twenty-nine

Round thirty

Hall of Famers
 Raymond Berry, wide receiver from Southern Methodist University taken 20th round 232nd overall by the Baltimore Colts.
Inducted: Professional Football Hall of Fame class of 1973.

Notable undrafted players

References

External links
 NFL.com – 1954 Draft
 databaseFootball.com – 1954 Draft
 Pro Football Hall of Fame

National Football League Draft
Draft
NFL draft
NFL Draft
American football in Philadelphia
Events in Philadelphia
1950s in Philadelphia